Minnesota State Highway 104 (MN 104) is a  highway in west-central Minnesota, which runs from its intersection with State Highway 9 in Norway Lake Township near Sunburg and continues north to its northern terminus at its intersection with State Highways 28 and 29 in  the city of Glenwood.

Route description
State Highway 104 serves as a north–south and an east–west route between Sunburg and Glenwood in west-central Minnesota.

Highway 104 changes direction to east–west in Chippewa Falls Township and continues as east–west for 6 miles before returning again to a north–south direction in Barsness Township for the remainder of its route to Glenwood.

The highway is officially marked as a north–south route by its highway shields from beginning to end.

The route serves as the county line in northwest Kandiyohi County and northeast Swift County.

Highway 104 is also known as Franklin Street South in the city of Glenwood.

Monson Lake State Park is located west of Sunburg and west of the junction of Highway 104 and State Highway 9.  The park entrance is located off Highway 9 via County Road 95.

The route is legally defined as Route 143 in the Minnesota Statutes. It is not marked with this number.

History
State Highway 104 was authorized on April 22, 1933.

The route was completely paved by 1960.

From 1934 until 2005, State Highway 104 had continued farther south.  The section of present-day Kandiyohi County State-Aid Highway 7 between State Highway 9 (at Sunburg) and U.S. Highway 12 (west of Pennock and Willmar) was originally designated Highway 104 until 2005. The original length of 104 was 41 miles.

Major intersections

References

104
Transportation in Kandiyohi County, Minnesota
Transportation in Swift County, Minnesota
Transportation in Pope County, Minnesota